The Liga Nacional de Handebol 2015 (2015 National Handball League) is the 19th season of the top tier Brazilian handball national competitions for clubs, it is organized by the Brazilian Handball Confederation.

Qualification Round

Group A

Group B

Semifinal

Final

References

External links
Official website

2015 in handball